Frigyes Hollósi (21 April 1941 – 5 December 2012) was a Hungarian actor. He was born in Budapest, as Frigyes Weininger.

Partial filmography
The Vulture (1982)
Night Rehearsal (1983)
Tight Quarters (1983)
Love, Mother (1987)
 Paths of Death and Angels (1991)
 We Never Die (1993) 
 Sunshine (1999)

References

External links

1941 births
2012 deaths
Hungarian male film actors
Male actors from Budapest